Isaac Owens House, also known as the Gannt-Williams House or John Walker House, is a historic building located at 2806 N Street NW Washington, D.C., in the Georgetown neighborhood.

History
The row house was constructed in 1816, and is an example of Federal architecture. 
John W. Lumsden bought the house in 1856.  
Katherine B. Cunningham bought the house in 1921.
Drew Pearson lived there in 1927.
John Walker bought the house in 1940.

The Isaac Owens House is listed on the National Register of Historic Places, and is a contributing property to the Georgetown Historic District. Its 2009 property value is $2,935,970.

See also
John Stoddert Haw House

References

External links
 

Houses on the National Register of Historic Places in Washington, D.C.
District of Columbia Inventory of Historic Sites
Individually listed contributing properties to historic districts on the National Register in Washington, D.C.
Houses completed in 1816
Federal architecture in Washington, D.C.
Georgetown (Washington, D.C.)